Declan Oliver Perkins (born 17 October 1975) is a former footballer who played as a forward. Born in England, he represented the Republic of Ireland internationally at youth level.

Club career
Perkins began his career at Southend United, after playing for the club's academy. During his time at Southend, Perkins made six Football League appearances, as well as going out on loan to Chelmsford City and Cambridge United. Following his spell at Southend, Perkins played football in Hong Kong for Happy Valley and Sing Tao. Following his spell in Hong Kong, Perkins joined South African club Hellenic, before signing for Purfleet. In October 1999, Perkins joined League of Ireland Premier Division club Finn Harps. Perkins only featured in one match day squad for Finn Harps on 23 October 1999 against Bohemians, before being released.

In late 1999, Perkins returned to England, signing for Braintree Town. In 2000, Perkins signed for Dulwich Hamlet, staying with the club for three years. Perkins subsequently played for Ford United and Waltham Forest, before signing for St Albans City in April 2004, where he made seven appearances, scoring once. Perkins joined Barking & East Ham United for the 2004–05 season, making 22 appearances, scoring 8 times in all competitions. Perkins' career finished with spells at Ilford and Redbridge.

International career
Perkins represented the Republic of Ireland under-18 and under-21 levels. On 10 June 1995, Perkins scored twice for Ireland's U21's against Austria U21.

Outside football
Perkins held acting roles in Dream Team and Mike Bassett: England Manager. In June 2015, Perkins was named vice chairman of Hackney Wick, helping sponsor the club whilst working as a publican in the area.

Personal life
Perkins' sister is the actress Louise Lombard. Perkins' son, Sonny, currently plays for Leeds United.

References

1975 births
Living people
Association football forwards
Republic of Ireland association footballers
Republic of Ireland youth international footballers
Republic of Ireland under-21 international footballers
English footballers
English people of Irish descent
Footballers from Ilford
Southend United F.C. players
Chelmsford City F.C. players
Cambridge United F.C. players
Happy Valley AA players
Sing Tao SC players
Hellenic F.C. players
Thurrock F.C. players
Finn Harps F.C. players
Braintree Town F.C. players
Dulwich Hamlet F.C. players
Redbridge F.C. players
Waltham Forest F.C. players
St Albans City F.C. players
Barking & East Ham United F.C. players
Ilford F.C. players
English Football League players
Hong Kong First Division League players
English expatriate footballers
Expatriate footballers in Hong Kong
English expatriate sportspeople in Hong Kong
Expatriate soccer players in South Africa
English expatriate sportspeople in South Africa
English expatriate sportspeople in Ireland
Expatriate association footballers in the Republic of Ireland
British male film actors
21st-century British male actors
Publicans